Bairagirchar High School is a secondary school in Katiadi Upazila, Kishoreganj District, Dhaka Division, Bangladesh.

History 
Bairagirchar High School is one of the oldest schools in Katiadi, Kishoregonj. The school was established after the liberation war of Bangladesh. In 1972 some renowned people of Bairagirchat planned to set up a school in the village so they took initiative for the establishment of the school.

Description

Address

Groups 

There are three groups in the school
 Science
 Business Studies
 Arts

Faculty 

 ABM Burhan Uddin
 Mahmuda Akhter
 Jibon Kumar Boumik
 Swapon Kumar Boumik
 Athahar Ali

References

Education in Bangladesh